Onchodellus is a genus of mites in the family Pachylaelapidae. There are more than 70 described species in Onchodellus.

Species
These 77 species belong to the genus Onchodellus:

 Onchodellus aegypticus (Hafez & Nasr, 1982)
 Onchodellus ambulacralis (Ryke & Meyer, 1958)
 Onchodellus anovillosus (Berlese, 1920)
 Onchodellus antillanus Turk, 1948
 Onchodellus armatus (André, 1945)
 Onchodellus auricularis (Moraza & Peña, 2005)
 Onchodellus australis (Berlese, 1910)
 Onchodellus bibulus Mašán, 2007
 Onchodellus brachiosus (Hirschmann & Krauss, 1965)
 Onchodellus bregetovae (Koroleva, 1977)
 Onchodellus brevicrinitus (Hirschmann & Krauss, 1965)
 Onchodellus brevis (Berlese, 1920)
 Onchodellus brevisetosus (Gu, Huang & Li, 1991)
 Onchodellus brevisternalis (Koroleva, 1977)
 Onchodellus calcaratus (Koroleva, 1977)
 Onchodellus canariensis (Moraza & Peña, 2005)
 Onchodellus concinnus (Hirschmann & Krauss, 1965)
 Onchodellus copris (Ishikawa, 1984)
 Onchodellus cordiformis (Berlese, 1910)
 Onchodellus ctenophorus (Oudemans, 1901)
 Onchodellus daruma (Ishikawa, 1977)
 Onchodellus davydovae (Alexandrova, 1980)
 Onchodellus dorsalis (Bhattacharyya, 1970)
 Onchodellus eurasius (Vitzthum, 1925)
 Onchodellus facetus (Hirschmann & Krauss, 1965)
 Onchodellus falcifer (Hirschmann & Krauss, 1965)
 Onchodellus falculiger (Berlese, 1910)
 Onchodellus flavus (Lombardini, 1941)
 Onchodellus friedrichi Mašán, 2007
 Onchodellus gansuensis (Ma, 1985)
 Onchodellus glandularis (Moraza & Peña, 2005)
 Onchodellus harukoae (Ishikawa, 1984)
 Onchodellus heliocopridis (Ryke & Meyer, 1958)
 Onchodellus helveticus Mašán, 2007
 Onchodellus hispani (Berlese, 1908)
 Onchodellus intermedius (Moraza & Peña, 2005)
 Onchodellus ishizuchiensis (Ishikawa, 1977)
 Onchodellus islandicus (Sellnick, 1969)
 Onchodellus jurassicus (Schweizer, 1961)
 Onchodellus karawaiewi (Berlese, 1920)
 Onchodellus kievati (Davydova, 1971)
 Onchodellus longus (Costa, 1971)
 Onchodellus michaelcostai Mašán & Halliday, 2014
 Onchodellus minutus (Oudemans, 1901)
 Onchodellus mixtus Mašán, 2007
 Onchodellus monticolus (Vitzthum, 1926)
 Onchodellus montivagus Mašán, 2007
 Onchodellus morazae Mašán & Halliday, 2014
 Onchodellus neglectus Mašán, 2007
 Onchodellus nidicolens (Koroleva, 1977)
 Onchodellus novus (Sellnick, 1943)
 Onchodellus onthophagi Mašán, 2007
 Onchodellus orientalis (Koroleva, 1977)
 Onchodellus parvulus (Koroleva, 1977)
 Onchodellus procerus Mašán, 2007
 Onchodellus quadritus (Gu, Huang & Li, 1991)
 Onchodellus regularis (Berlese, 1920)
 Onchodellus reticulatus (Berlese, 1904)
 Onchodellus roosevelti (Wharton, 1941)
 Onchodellus runculiger (Berlese, 1910)
 Onchodellus setosus (Bhattacharyya, 1970)
 Onchodellus siculus (Berlese, 1892)
 Onchodellus slovacus Mašán, 2014
 Onchodellus spectabilis (Berlese, 1910)
 Onchodellus squamosus (Koroleva, 1977)
 Onchodellus striatifer Mašán, 2007
 Onchodellus strigifer (Berlese, 1892)
 Onchodellus substrictus Mašán, 2007
 Onchodellus tegulifer Mašán, 2007
 Onchodellus tesselatus (Berlese, 1920)
 Onchodellus torocoxus (Gu, Huang & Li, 1991)
 Onchodellus trupchumi (Schweizer, 1961)
 Onchodellus tsengyihsiungi (Ma, Ho & Wang, 2008)
 Onchodellus volkovae (Goncharova & Koroleva, 1974)
 Onchodellus xinghaiensis (Ma, 1985)
 Onchodellus xizangensis (Ma & Wang, 1997)
 Onchodellus zoborensis Mašán, 2007

References

Acari